Beltona Resonator Instruments is a UK musical instruments manufacturing company based in Leeds, West Yorkshire. Since its foundation, Beltona has been producing resonator instruments, more specifically guitars, mandolins and ukuleles.

History 
The company started as a partnership between luthier Steve Evans and engineer Bill Johnson, who shared an interest in resonator instruments. In the mid-1990s and with the purpose of cutting down production costs, the company started to use materials such as carbon and glass fibre in the production of instruments.

These materials had several advantages over metal including weight, strength and speed of production. Beltona's success led the company to concentrate only on instruments made of resin since 2002. By those times, Evans became the sole owner of the business. After some years in New Zealand, the company returned to England in 2013.

Musicians 
Michael Messer 
Keb' Mo'
Kristina Olsen

References

External links
 

Companies based in Leeds
String instrument manufacturing companies
Musical instrument manufacturing companies of New Zealand
Ukulele makers
Musical instrument manufacturing companies of the United Kingdom
Mandolin makers
British brands